Jean Stern (19 February 1875 – 15 December 1962) was a French Olympic champion épée fencer.

Personal life
Stern was Jewish. He was born in Paris, the son of French banker Louis Stern (1844-1900) and Claude Lambert. His father was the son of Antoine Jacob Stern, also well known in banking circles, and a scion of the wealthy Stern family of the AJ Stern & Co. banking house.

Jean Stern was also the cousin of composer Fernand Halphen, and nephew of actress . In 1904 Stern married Claude Lambert, daughter of Baron Léon Lambert and Baroness Zoe Lucie de Rothschild.

Olympic fencing career
Stern competed with the French épée team at the 1908 Summer Olympics in London at 33 years of age, fencing in their competition against Denmark. The team won the gold medal. Stern also competed in the individual épée event, finishing in 12th place.

See also
 List of Jewish fencers

References

External links
 
 Jews in Sports bio

1875 births
1962 deaths
French male épée fencers
Jewish French sportspeople
Jewish male épée fencers
Rothschild family
Olympic fencers of France
Olympic gold medalists for France
Medalists at the 1908 Summer Olympics
Fencers at the 1908 Summer Olympics
Fencers from Paris
Olympic medalists in fencing
Stern family (banking)